Brett Morley (born 1960) is an England international lawn and indoor bowler.

Bowls career
He followed his father Stanley Morley in gaining international honours  and won a gold medal in the fours with Andy Thomson, David Cutler and John Bell at the 1996 World Outdoor Bowls Championship in Worthing.

He also represented England in the fours event, at the 1998 Commonwealth Games in Kuala Lumpur, Malaysia.

Morley was the National champion in 1994 and subsequently won the singles at the British Isles Bowls Championships in 1995.

References

1960 births
Living people
English male bowls players
Bowls World Champions
Bowls players at the 1998 Commonwealth Games
Commonwealth Games competitors for England